Sut-Kholsky District (Süt-Xöl kojuun) is an administrative and municipal district (raion, or kozhuun), one of the seventeen in the Tuva Republic, Russia. It is located in the west of the republic. Its administrative center is the rural locality (a selo) of Sug-Aksy. Population:  8,430 (2002 Census);  The population of Sug-Aksy accounts for 39.7% of the district's total population.

References

Notes

Sources

Districts of Tuva